Datora is a village situated in the Multai Tehsil, Betul district, Madhya Pradesh, India. 
It holds a three-day fair every two years in the months of December–January. 

There is a guest house in the village in the valley of Datora. There is a small lake beside the temple.

References

External links
 Datora at WikiMapia

Villages in Betul district